Lou Pecora is an American visual effects artist. He was nominated for an Academy Award in the category Best Visual Effects for the film X-Men: Days of Future Past.

Selected filmography 
 X-Men: Days of Future Past (2014; co-nominated with Richard Stammers, Tim Crosbie and Cameron Waldbauer)

References

External links 

Living people
Place of birth missing (living people)
Year of birth missing (living people)
Visual effects artists
Visual effects supervisors
California State University, Fresno alumni